Philippe Schreck (born 2 February 1972) is a French lawyer and politician of the National Rally. He has been a deputy in the National Assembly for Var's 8th constituency since 2022.

Schreck trained as a lawyer and an worked as an attorney in Draguignan specialising in property law. He also previously served as the president of SC Draguignan football club.

Since 2020 he has been a municipal councilor in Draguignan and was elected RN deputy for the eighth district of Var during the 2022 French legislative election.

References 

Living people
1972 births
Deputies of the 16th National Assembly of the French Fifth Republic
21st-century French politicians
Members of Parliament for Var
National Rally (France) politicians